Joseph Kenneth Azelby (born March 5, 1962) is a former a professional American football player who played linebacker for the 1984 season for the Buffalo Bills

Since then Azelby has gone on to a career at JPMorgan Chase, which he joined after leaving the NFL and where he served as global head of JP Morgan's real asset investment group, overseeing a team of 400 investment professionals investments worth in excess of $60 billion. In the spring of 2017, he joined Apollo Global Management in a similar role. He left Apollo in 2018 after differences with other managers over attracting investors and assembling a team for the real assets division. In March 2019, Azelby was announced as the head of UBS's $100 billion real estate and private markets division.

Raised in Dumont and a graduate of Bergen Catholic High School, Azelby has been a resident of nearby Cresskill.

References

Living people
1962 births
American football linebackers
Bergen Catholic High School alumni
Buffalo Bills players
Harvard Crimson football players
People from Cresskill, New Jersey
People from Dumont, New Jersey